Ward 1 is a ward of District 11 in Ho Chi Minh City, Vietnam.

References

Populated places in Ho Chi Minh City